Susan Blanchard Ryan (born January 12, 1967) is an American actress. After working in MTV and other minor parts on television and independent film, she went on to star in the 2003 film Open Water, for which she won the 2004 Saturn Award for Best Actress. She has since starred in the films The Brooklyn Heist and It's Complicated.

Early life
Ryan was born in Boston, Massachusetts. She grew up in Andover. Her mother, Brenda, is a French teacher, and her father, Ron Ryan, was President of the National Hockey League's Philadelphia Flyers, and former Coach and General Manager to the Hartford Whalers, which moved to North Carolina and were renamed the Carolina Hurricanes. Ryan is an avid ice Hockey fan. Ryan graduated from the University of New Hampshire with a Bachelor of Arts in political philosophy.

Career
After graduating from college, Ryan worked at MTV in its special effects department. She started acting in commercials while studying acting and improvisation in New York City. Since someone called Susan Ryan was already registered with the Screen Actors Guild, Ryan used her middle name instead. In 2000, she appeared in an episode of Sex and the City. She was in the Broken Lizard films Super Troopers and Beerfest, as well as Big Helium Dog and several independent films. Ryan's most notable film role was in the 2003 film Open Water, for which she won the 2004 Saturn Award for Best Actress. Despite the film's success, she made only one film in the next five years (Beerfest). She appeared in four films in 2008 and two in 2009, including Under New Management and It's Complicated.

Filmography

References

External links
 

1967 births
20th-century American actresses
21st-century American actresses
American film actresses
American soap opera actresses
American television actresses
Actresses from Boston
Living people
University of New Hampshire alumni